Father's Affair is a 2003 Dutch drama film.

It received a Golden Film award for 100,000 visitors and a Golden Calf award for Best Sound.

External links

2003 films
2003 drama films
2000s Dutch-language films
Dutch drama films